National Highway 75 (NH 75) is one of major National Highway in India. passing through states of Karnataka, Andhra Pradesh, and Tamil Nadu. This national highway was earlier known as National Highway 48 (NH-48) before rationalisation of highway numbers in 2010. The highway connects the port city of Mangaluru (Mangalore) in the west to the city of Vellore in the east. NH-75 traverses all three geographical regions of Karnataka state namely Karavali, Malenadu and Bayaluseeme.

Renamed roads 
KA SH 54 (Belur Road), NH 373, NH 69

Route 

It starts at Bantwal in Karnataka state and passes through Nellyadi, Shiradi ghat, Sakleshpura, Hassan, Yediyur, Kunigal, Bengaluru, Kolar, Mulbagal, Venkatagirikota, Pernambut, Gudiyattam, Katpadi before terminating at Vellore in Tamil Nadu. This highway bypasses Hassan and Kunigal main town area.

State–wise route length in km.
Karnataka - 
Andhra Pradesh – 
Tamil Nadu -

Junctions 

  Terminal near Bantwal.
  near Bantwal
  near Hassan
  at Bellur Cross
  near Nelamangala
  near Hebbal
  near Hoskote
  near Hoskote
  near Mulbagal
  near Venkatagirikota
  Terminal near Vellore.

See also 
 List of National Highways in India (by Highway Number)
 List of National Highways in India
 National Highways Development Project
 List of National Highways in Karnataka
 National Highway 169 (India)
 National Highway 66 (India)
 Ghat Roads

References

External links 
 NH 75 on OpenStreetMap

National highways in India
National Highways in Karnataka
National Highways in Andhra Pradesh
National Highways in Tamil Nadu
Transport in Vellore